The 2018 South Carolina Gamecocks baseball team represented the University of South Carolina in the 2018 NCAA Division I baseball season.  The Gamecocks played their home games at Founders Park. The team was led by first year head coach Mark Kingston.

Roster

Coaching staff

Schedule

! style=""| Regular Season
|- 

|- align="center" bgcolor="ffdddd"
| February 16 ||  || No. 19 || Founders Park Columbia, SC || 6–7 || Tremblay (1–0) || Hill (0–1) ||  Eagle (1) || 7,484 || 0–1 || –
|- align="center" bgcolor="ddffdd"
| February 17 || VMI|| No. 19 || Founders Park || 7–2 || Morris (1–0) || Kent 0-1 || None || 6,627 || 1–1 || –
|- align="center" bgcolor="ddffdd"
| February 18 || VMI || No. 19 || Founders Park || 9–0 || R. Chapman (1–0) || Watts (0–1) || None || 6,612 || 2–1 || –
|- align="center" bgcolor="ddffdd"
|  ||  || No. 21 || Founders Park || 5–2 || Bridges (1–0) || Vaka (0–1) || Demurias (1)|| 6,120 || 3–1 || –
|- align="center" bgcolor="ddffdd"
| February 21 ||  || No. 21 || Founders Park || 15–2 ||  || Arnone (0–1) || None || 6,080 || 4–1 || –
|- align="center" bgcolor="ddffdd"
| February 23 || || No. 21 || Founders Park || 7–0 || Hill (1–1) ||  || None || 6,577 || 5–1 || –
|- align="center" bgcolor="ddffdd"
| February 24 ||  || No. 21 || Founders Park || 14–2 || Morris (2–0) || Stoudemire 0–2 || None || 7,423 || 6–1 || –
|- align="center" bgcolor="ffdddd"
| February 25 || Charleston Southern || No. 21 || Founders Park || 2–4 || Weekley (1–1) || R. Chapman (1–1) || Smith (2) || 6,353 || 6–2 || –
|- align="center" bgcolor="ffdddd"
| February 27 ||  ||  || Founders Park || 4–6 || Alley (1–0) || Mlodzinski (0–1) ||  || 6,107 || 6–3 || –
|- 

|- align="center" bgcolor="ddffdd"
| March 2 || No. 7 Clemson ||  || Founders Park || 3–2 ||  || Gilliam 1–1 || None || 8,242 || 7–3 || –
|- align="center" bgcolor="ffdddd"
| March 3 ||  || No. 23 || Flour Field Greenville, SC || 1–5 || Clark (2–0) || Morris (2–1) || Miller (1) || 7,385 || 7–4 || –
|- align="center" bgcolor="ffdddd"
| March 4 || at No. 7 Clemson || No. 23 || Clemson, SC  || 7–8 || Gilliam (2–1) ||  || None || 6,312 || 7–5 || –
|- align="center" bgcolor="bbbbbb"
| March 6 ||  ||  || BB&T BallparkCharlotte, NC || colspan=7|Cancelled (rain) 
|- align="center" bgcolor="ddffdd"
| March 7 ||  ||  || Founders Park || 12–2 || Shook (1–0) || McAlister 0–1 || None || 6,027 || 8–5 || –
|- align="center" bgcolor="ddffdd"
| March 9 ||  ||  || Founders Park || 9–2 || Hill (2–1) || Gross (0–2) || Gilreath (1) || 6,245 || 9–5 || –
|- align="center" bgcolor="ddffdd"
| March 10 (1) || Princeton ||  || Founders Park || 7–3 || Morris (3–1) || Smith (0–1) || Lomas (1) || 6,425 || 10–5 || –
|- align="center" bgcolor="ddffdd"
|  || Princeton ||  || Founders Park || 6–4 || Demurias (2–0) || Proctor (0–1) ||  || 6,114 || 11–5 || –
|- align="center" bgcolor="ddffdd"
| March 14 ||  ||  || Founders Park || 12–3 || Coyne (1–0) || Bigge (1–1) || None || 5,705 || 12–5 || –
|- align="center" bgcolor="ffdddd"
| March 16 || No. 6 Florida ||  || Founders Park || 3–7 || Singer (5–0) || Hill (2–2) || Byrne (4) || 7,034 || 12–6 || 0–1
|- align="center" bgcolor="ddffdd"
| March 17 || No. 6 Florida ||  || Founders Park || 15–7 || Morris (4–1) || Kowar (3–1) || None || 7,207 || 13–6 || 1–1
|- align="center" bgcolor="ffdddd"
| March 18 || No. 6 Florida ||  || Founders Park || 2–3 || Dyson (4–1) ||  || Byrne (5) || 7,113 || 13–7 || 1–2
|- align="center" bgcolor="ffdddd"
| March 20 || The Citadel ||  || Founders Park || 3–4 || Buster (3–1) || Coyne (1–1) || None || 6,307 || 13–8 || –
|- align="center" bgcolor="ffdddd"
| March 23 || at  ||  || Foley FieldAthens, GA || 5–7 || Locey (4–0) || Lawson (0–1) || Schunk (1) || 2,785 || 13–9 || 1–3
|- align="center" bgcolor="ffdddd"
| March 24 || at Georgia ||  || Foley Field || 3–12 || Hancock (3–1) || Morris (0–2) || None || 3,481 || 13–10 || 1–4
|- align="center" bgcolor="ffdddd"
| March 25 || at Georgia ||  || Foley Field || 0–3 || Webb (1–1) || R. Chapman (1–3) || Schunk (2) || 2,443 || 13–11 || 1–5
|- align="center" bgcolor="ddffdd"
| March 27 ||  ||  || Founders Park || 5–4 ||  || LaCagnina (0–2) || Demurias (2) || 5,824  || 14–11 || –
|- align="center" bgcolor="ddffdd"
| March 29 || Tennessee ||  || Founders Park || 6–1 ||Hill (3–2)|| Crochet (2–3) || None || 6,425  || 15–11 || 2–5
|- align="center" bgcolor="ddffdd"
| March 30 || Tennessee ||  || Founders Park || 6–2 ||Morris (5–2)|| Stallings (4–2) || None || 6,945  || 16–11 || 3–5
|- align="center" bgcolor="ddffdd"
| March 31 || Tennessee ||  || Founders Park || 6–3 ||Demurias (3–0)|| Linginfelter (2–2) || None || 7,816  || 17–11 || 4–5
|-

|- align="center" bgcolor="ffdddd"
| April 3 ||  ||  || BB&T Ballpark || 3–11 ||   ||  || None || 7,410 || 17–12 || –
|- align="center" bgcolor="ffdddd"
| April 6 || at Kentucky ||  || Cliff Hagan StadiumLexington, KY || 1–14 || Hjelle (5–2) || Hill (3–3) || None || 3,422 || 17–13 || 4–6
|- align="center" bgcolor="ddffdd"
| April 7 || at Kentucky ||  || Cliff Hagan Stadium || 15–1 || Morris (6–2) ||  Haake (1–2) || Bridges (1) || 2,642 || 18–13 || 5–6
|- align="center" bgcolor="ffdddd"
| April 8 || at Kentucky ||  || Cliff Hagan Stadium || 5–10 || Lewis (6–2) ||  ||  || 2,853 || 18–14 || 5–7
|- align="center" bgcolor="ddffdd"
| April 10 || at The Citadel ||  || Joseph P. Riley Jr. ParkCharleston, SC || 12–1 || Mlodzinski (1–3) ||  Sabo (0–1) || None || 1,573 || 19–14 || –
|- align="center" bgcolor="ddffdd"
| April 12 || at No. 7 Arkansas ||  || Baum StadiumFayetteville, AR || 3–2 || Bridges (2–0) ||  Loseke (0–1) || Demurias (3) || 8,416 || 20–14 || 6–7
|- align="center" bgcolor="bbbbbb"
| April 13 || at No. 7 Arkansas ||  || Baum Stadium || colspan=7| Postponed (severe weather) Makeup: April 14 as a single-admission, 7-inning doubleheader
|- align="center" bgcolor="ffdddd"
| April 14 (1) || at No. 7 Arkansas ||  || Baum Stadium || 0–27 || Murphy (5–2) || Hill (3–4) || Cronin (8) || 9,680 || 20–15 || 6–8
|- align="center" bgcolor="ffdddd"
|  || at No. 7 Arkansas ||  || Baum Stadium || 0–37 || Campbell (3–3) || Morris (6–3) || Cronin (9) || 9,680 || 20–16 || 6–9
|- align="center" bgcolor="ffdddd"
| April 17 ||  ||  || Founders Park || 4–7 || Paradis (1–3) || Mlodzinski (1–4) || Springs (1) || 6,104 || 20–17 || –
|- align="center" bgcolor="ddffdd"
| April 20 || No. 18 LSU ||  || Founders Park || 11–0 ||  ||  Hess (6–4) || None || 6,952 || 21–17 || 7–9
|- align="center" bgcolor="ddffdd"
| April 21 || No. 18 LSU ||  || Founders Park || 11–4 ||  ||  Hilliard (7–3) || None || 7,982 || 22–17 || 8–9
|- align="center" bgcolor="ddffdd"
| April 22 || No. 18 LSU ||  || Founders Park || 8–6 ||  ||  Bain (1–2) || Bridges (2) || 7,141 || 23–17 || 9–9
|- align="center" bgcolor="ddffdd"
| April 24 || at Furman  ||  || Greenville, SC|| 10–2 ||  ||  Alley (2–3) || None || 2,030 || 24–17 || –
|- align="center" bgcolor="ddffdd"
| April 27 || at No. 12  || No. 25 || Hawkins FieldNashville, TN|| 8–7 ||  ||  Brown (1–3) || Bridges (3) || 2,895 || 25–17 || 10–9
|- align="center" bgcolor="ffdddd"
| April 28 || at No. 12 Vanderbilt || No. 25 || Hawkins Field || 1–8 || Raby (3–4) ||  || None || 3,166 || 25–18 || 10–10
|- align="center" bgcolor="ddffdd"
| April 29 || at No. 12 Vanderbilt || No. 25 || Hawkins Field || 10–9 ||  ||  Day (1–1) || None || 3,158 || 26–18 || 11–10
|-

|- align="center" bgcolor="ddffdd"
| May 4 || No. 11 Ole Miss ||  || Founders Park || 13–5 ||  ||  Rolison (6–4) || None || 7,559 || 27–18 || 12–10
|- align="center" bgcolor="ddffdd"
| May 5 || No. 11 Ole Miss || No. 14 || Founders Park || 11–6 ||  ||  Feigl (7–4) || None || 7,692 || 28–18 || 13–10
|- align="center" bgcolor="ffdddd"
| May 6 || No. 11 Ole Miss || No. 14 || Founders Park || 5–610 || Caracci  (3–2) ||  || None || 6,852 || 28–19 || 13–11
|- align="center" bgcolor="ffdddd"
| May 9 ||  || No. 11 || Columbia, SC  || 0–9 || Sisk (9–3) ||  || None || 5,867 || 28–20 || –
|- align="center" bgcolor="ffdddd"
| May 11 || Missouri || No. 11 || Founders Park || 3–5 || Toelken (5–2) || L. Chapman (3–1) || Ball (6) || 6,922 || 28–21 || 13–12
|- align="center" bgcolor="ddffdd"
| May 12 || Missouri || No. 11 || Founders Park || 6–3 ||  ||  Plassmeyer (5–3) || None || 7,216 || 29–21 || 14–12
|- align="center" bgcolor="ddffdd"
|  || Missouri || No. 11 || Founders Park || 1–0 ||  ||  LaPlante (4–3) || None || 6,435 || 30–21 || 15–12
|- align="center" bgcolor="bbbbbb"
| May 15 ||  || No. 11 || Founders Park || colspan=7| Canceled (impending weather)
|- align="center" bgcolor="ffdddd"
| May 17 || at  || No. 11 || Olsen FieldCollege Station, TX || 3–6 || Chafin (4–0) ||  || None || 4,615 || 30–22 || 15–13
|- align="center" bgcolor="ddffdd"
| May 18 || at Texas A&M|| No. 11 || Olsen Field || 5–3 ||  || Doxakis (6–5) ||  || 4,770  || 31–22 || 16–13
|- align="center" bgcolor="ddffdd"
| May 19 || at Texas A&M || No. 11 || Olsen Field || 10–1 ||  || Kolek (5–6) || None || 5,101 || 32–22 || 17–13
|-

|-
! style=""|Postseason
|- 

|- align="center" bgcolor="ddffdd"
| May 22 || vs. (12) Missouri ||  || Metropolitan StadiumHoover, AL || 4–2 ||  || Toelken (6–3) || Lawson (2) || 8,072 || 33–22 || 1–0
|- align="center" bgcolor="ffdddd"
| May 23 || vs. No. 9 (4) Arkansas ||  || Metropolitan Stadium || 8–13 || Murphy (7–4) || L. Chapman (3–3) || None || 6,710 || 33–23 || 1–1
|- align="center" bgcolor="ffdddd"
| May 24 || vs. (8) LSU ||  || Metropolitan Stadium || 4–612 || Peterson (1–3) || Gilreath (0–1) || None || 7,197 || 33–24 || 1–2
|-

|- align="center" bgcolor="ddffdd"
| June 1 || vs. (3)  ||  || Clark–LeClair StadiumGreenville, NC || 8–3 ||  || Kinker (6–2) || Lawson (3) || 4,700 || 34–24 || 1–0
|- align="center" bgcolor="ddffdd"
| June 2 || at   ||  || Clark–LeClair Stadium || 4–2 ||  || Burleson (5–2) || Lawson (4) || 4,700 || 35–24 || 2–0
|- align="center" bgcolor="bbbbbb"
| June 3 || vs. (4)  ||  || Clark–LeClair Stadium || colspan=7| Postponed (rain) Makeup: June 4
|- align="center" bgcolor="ddffdd"
| June 4 || vs. (4) UNC Wilmington ||  || Clark–LeClair Stadium || 8–4 ||  || Royalty (6–6) || None || 4,700 || 36–24 || 3–0
|-

Record}}
|- align="center" bgcolor="ffdddd"
| June 9 || at No. 4 (5) Arkansas ||  || Baum Stadium || 3–9 || Knight (12–0) || Demurias (7–1) || Loseke (4) || 11,722 || 36–25 || 0–1
|- align="center" bgcolor="ddffdd"
| June 10 || vs. No. 4 (5) Arkansas ||  || Baum Stadium || 8–5 || Morris (9–3) || Murphy (8–5) || Bridges (5) || 11,481 || 37–25 || 1–1
|- align="center" bgcolor="ffdddd"
| June 11 || at No. 4 (5) Arkansas ||  || Baum Stadium || 4–14 || Loseke (3–2) || Mlodzinski (3–6) || None || 11,217 || 37–26 || 1–2
|-

Record vs. conference opponents

Rankings

References

External links
 Gamecock Baseball official website 

South Carolina Gamecocks baseball seasons
South Carolina Gamecocks Baseball Team, 2018
South
South Carolina